The Tokyo Okan Sho (in Japanese: 東京王冠賞), was a horse race for three-year-olds at Ohi Racecourse.

Race details

The race was held at various lengths throughout its existence including 2,000 meters, 2,400 meters and 2,600 meters before 1,800 meters was settled on for its last two races. All editions of the race took place at Ohi Racecourse.

The race was held during October and November for most of its existence, but later moved to June and May in its final years.

The final edition of the race was held on May 10, 2001.

Past winners
Past winners include:

See also
 Horse racing in Japan
 List of Japanese flat horse races

References

Horse races in Japan